Exiguodon ("strict tooth") is an extinct genus of hyainailourid hyaenodont mammal of the polyphyletic tribe Hyainailourini within paraphyletic subfamily Hyainailourinae. Remains are known from early Miocene deposits in Kenya and Uganda, in East Africa.

Description
Exiguodon is distinguished from other hyainailourines by the following features: diminutive dimensions, lower molars (m3 – m2) with greatly reduced talonid; protoconid and paraconid similar in size. Paraconid of the molars lingually oriented. M2 and M1 close in size and morphology. Occlusal outline sub-triangular, with greatly reduced protocone, which appears like an antero-lingual cingulum which extends anteriorly and buccally. Presence of a strong parastyle in an antero-buccal position, united to the apex of the paracone by a well defined crista. The buccal cingulum borders a wide buccal platform, particularly large in the M2. Paracone tall and narrow, elongated blade-like metastyle. P4 broadened, with reduced protocone and presence of a notch between the main conical cusp and the blade-like posterior cusp.

Classification and phylogeny

Taxonomy
Exiguodon pilgrimi was originally described as Hyaenodon (Isohyaenodon) pilgrimi by R. J. G. Savage (1965), who coined Isohyaenodon as a subgenus of Hyaenodon. Later authors recognized Isohyaenodon as distinct from Hyaenodon, and Morales and Pickford (2017) eventually realized that pilgrimi was sufficiently distinct from all other African hyainailourines to warrant its own genus, which they named Exiguodon.

Phylogeny
The phylogenetic relationships of genus Exiguodon are shown in the following cladogram:

See also
 Mammal classification
 Hyainailourini

References

Hyaenodonts
Miocene mammals of Africa
Prehistoric placental genera